The 2019 Spanish motorcycle Grand Prix was the fourth round of the 2019 MotoGP season. It was held at the Circuito de Jerez-Ángel Nieto in Jerez de la Frontera on 5 May 2019.

Classification

MotoGP

 Andrea Iannone was declared unfit to start the race following a crash in practice.

Moto2

 Khairul Idham Pawi suffered a broken finger in a crash during Friday practice and withdrew from the event.

Moto3

Championship standings after the race

MotoGP

Moto2

Moto3

Notes

References

External links

Spain
Motorcycle Grand Prix
Spanish motorcycle Grand Prix
Spanish motorcycle Grand Prix